"Friend of Mine" is a song recorded by singer Kelly Price. It spent five weeks at number 1 on the U.S. R&B chart and was awarded a Soul Train Music Award for Best R&B/Soul or Rap New Artist.

In the song, Price details how her lover was stolen by her best friend.

The song became a pop hit in 1998, peaking at number 12 on the U.S. Pop chart. A remix was made of the song featuring R. Kelly and Ronald Isley.

Music video
The music video for the remix is directed by Hype Williams.

The video opens with Biggs (Ronald Isley) returning to his goddaughter Kelly. In tears, Kelly says she just discovered that her best friend had been sleeping with her husband (R. Kelly). Outraged to hear this, Biggs tells Kelly to call up her ex so he can talk to him. Kelly reluctantly does so and the song ends with Biggs scolding her ex for what he did while Kelly says she doesn't want him anymore.

Charts and certifications

Weekly charts

Year-end charts

Certifications

See also
List of number-one R&B singles of 1998 (U.S.)

References

1998 songs
1998 debut singles
Kelly Price songs
R. Kelly songs
Songs written by Anthony Dent
Songs written by Kelly Price
Songs written by R. Kelly
Island Records singles
Music videos directed by Hype Williams
Songs about infidelity
Contemporary R&B ballads
Soul ballads
1990s ballads